Taking his Chance is a 1914 film from director Raymond Longford based on a poem by Henry Lawson.

It is considered a lost film.

References

External links

Full text of poem

1914 films
Australian silent short films
Australian black-and-white films
Lost Australian films
Films directed by Raymond Longford